NexusDB is a relational commercial database engine for the Delphi, C++ Builder and .NET programming languages created by NexusDB Pty Ltd. It was developed as a successor to the TurboPower FlashFiler system for Delphi (still available for free download ). The database engine supports the SQL:2003 standard alongside Core SQL functionality as well as direct cursor based data access.

NexusDB also provides database connectors for easy access from various development and application environments:
 ADO.NET Provider for Visual Studio; supports Windows, Android, iOS, MacOSX targets
 ODBC/CLI Driver for Windows
 PHP Connector for Windows

The website has a Client/Server trial edition  and an online manual. A free version (without source code) for embedded/single user can be downloaded via the GetIt tool in Rad Studio XE8 or newer. An SQL-based third-party database development tool, Database Workbench, has been developed by Upscene Productions. Third-party support exists for Fast Report and ReportBuilder reporting tools.

References

External links
 NexusDB Homepage
 Product Information
 FlashFiler
 Database Workbench

Database engines
Proprietary database management systems
Pascal (programming language) software